The 1939 Maine Black Bears football team was an American football team that represented the University of Maine as a member of the New England Conference during the 1939 college football season. In its 19th season under head coach Fred Brice, the team compiled a 5–2 record (3–0 against conference opponents) and won the conference championship. The team played its home games at Alumni Field in Orono, Maine. Richard Dyer was the team captain.

Schedule

References

Maine
Maine Black Bears football seasons
Maine Black Bears football